"Portobello Road" by the Sherman Brothers is a song, specifically a waltz (3/4) about  Portobello Road in London, England (set in 1940). It was written for the 1971, Walt Disney musical film production Bedknobs and Broomsticks. It is sung by David Tomlinson about a street where, to this day– 

There is an extensive dance sequence where different groups including Scots, Jamaicans, British Army soldiers, Australian soldiers and Indians dance to the song's theme played in various styles.

The musical number set up is very similar to the "Consider Yourself" number from Oliver! in which butchers, policemen, carnival entertainers and fishmongers all dance in separate segments of the musical number.

References
 Sherman, Robert B. Walt's Time: from before to beyond. Santa Clarita: Camphor Tree Publishers, 1998.

Songs from Bedknobs and Broomsticks
1971 songs
Songs about London
Songs about roads
Songs written by the Sherman Brothers